is a JR East bus rapid transit line station.

Lines
Naiwan-Iriguchi Station is served by the Ōfunato Line, and is located 63 kilometers from the terminus of the line at Ichinoseki Station.

Station layout
Shishiori-Karakuwa Station is a double side platform serving bi-directional tracks.

History
The section between Kesennuma Station and Sakari Station of the Ofunato Line collapsed during the 2011 Tōhoku earthquake and tsunami, after which it was reconstructed as a bus rapid transit in December 2015. Kesennuma, Miyagi applied for the installation of nine new stations including Naiwan-Iriguchi along the Kesennuma BRT line in July 2016.

At first, the new station's name was to be "Kesennuma Shiyakusho-mae" (Kesennuma City Hall), however the city hall was later moved elsewhere. The approval for the new station in June 2020 attracted the public to propose names. These included "Kesennumawan Gateway", "Kanaegaura", and "Kesennuma Naiwan", with all proposed names emphasizing Kesennuma Bay in one way or another.

On 3 June 2020 construction of the stations were approved during the "First Kesennuma Public Transportation Conference" (令和2年度第1回気仙沼市地域公共交通会議).  On 25 June 2021 construction was officially announced by JR East. On 12 March 2022 the station opened.

Surrounding area
The station is located behind Kesennuma City Hall. However, it was announced that the city hall was to be moved elsewhere in January 2020.

Adjacent stations
 JR East
 Ofunato line BRT
 Rapid・Local
 Kesennuma Station - Naiwan-Iriguchi(Yōkamachi) Station - Shishiori-Karakuwa Station

References

External links
  

Railway stations in Miyagi Prefecture
Ōfunato Line
Railway stations in Japan opened in 2022
Kesennuma